The 1983 WTA Swiss Open was a women's tennis tournament played on outdoor clay courts in Lugano, Switzerland that was part of the 1983 Virginia Slims World Championship Series. It was the eighth edition of the tournament and was held from 9 May until 14 May 1983.

Finals

Singles
The singles tournament was cancelled following the conclusion of the third round due to rain.

Doubles
 Christiane Jolissaint /  Marcella Mesker defeated  Petra Delhees /  Patricia Medrado 6–2, 3–6, 7–5
 It was Jolissaint's 1st career title. It was Mesker's 1st career title.

Notes
 The tournament was halted by rain delays on 23 occasions over the first five days. The tournament was eventually cancelled after players rejected the officials attempts to move the tournament indoors.

References

External links
 ITF tournament edition details

Swiss Open
WTA Swiss Open
May 1983 sports events in Europe
1983 in Swiss tennis
1983 in Swiss women's sport